Nicolaus Ferber (1485 – 15 April 1534) was a German Franciscan and controversialist.

Life
Ferber was born at Herborn, Germany.  He was made provincial of the Franciscan province of Cologne. Pope Clement VII made him vicar-general of that branch of the order known as the Cismontane Observance, in which capacity he visited the various provinces of the order in England, Germany, Spain, and Belgium.

From about 1520 he was based at Marburg. At the synod of Homberg in 1526 he debated with François Lambert, ex-Franciscan, who had become adviser to Philip of Hesse. Ferber's position became untenable, and he moved to Brühl Abbey.

At the instance of the bishops of Denmark, he was called to Copenhagen to champion the Catholic cause against Danish Lutheranism.  He died at Toulouse.

Works

In Copenhagen he wrote in 1530, the Confutatio Lutheranismi Danici, first edited by L. Schmitt, S.J., and published at Quaracchi (1902), which earned for him the sobriquet of Stagefyr (fire-brand). Ferber's principal work is entitled: Locorum communium adversus hujus temporis hæreses Enchiridion, published at Cologne in 1528, with additions in 1529.

Besides this he wrote Assertiones CCCXXV adversus Fr. Lamberti paradoxa impia etc. (Cologne, 1526, and Paris, 1534); and Enarrationes latinæ Evangeliorum quadragesimalium, preached in German and published in Latin (Antwerp, 1533).

References
Schmitt, Der Kölner Theolog Nicolaus Stagefyr und der Franziskaner Nicolaus Herborn (Freiburg, 1896)
Hugo von Hurter, Nomenclator (Innsbruck, 1906), II, 1255–56
Sbaralea, Supplementum ad scriptores Ordinis Menorum, 556.

Notes

External links
Catholic Encyclopedia article

1485 births
1534 deaths
German Franciscans
16th-century German Catholic theologians
German male non-fiction writers
16th-century German male writers